American country music artist Lee Ann Womack has released nine studio albums, three compilation albums, one extended play, 30 singles, 20 music videos, and appeared on 43 albums. Womack's self-titled debut album was released in May 1997 on Decca Nashville Records. It peaked at number nine on the Billboard Top Country Albums chart and number 106 on the Billboard 200, certifying platinum from the Recording Industry Association of America. It featured the hit singles "Never Again, Again", "The Fool", and "You've Got to Talk to Me". Her gold-certifying second album Some Things I Know (1998) reached number 20 on the country albums chart, spawning the hits "A Little Past Little Rock" and "I'll Think of a Reason Later".

Womack's third studio album I Hope You Dance (2000) topped the Top Country Albums chart, reached number 16 on the Billboard 200, and certified triple platinum. The lead single brought her the biggest success of her career. It topped the Billboard Hot Country Songs chart, crossed over to number 14 on the Billboard Hot 100, and became a minor hit internationally. Her fourth studio record Something Worth Leaving Behind (2002) failed to match the commercial success of I Hope You Dance. A holiday album and greatest hits record appeared before the hit single, "I May Hate Myself in the Morning", and its accompanying There's More Where That Came From (2005). The album reached number 3 on the country chart and number 12 on the Billboard 200. Call Me Crazy (2008) debuted at number four on the Top Country Albums list and featured the top 20 hit "Last Call". Her eighth studio album The Way I'm Livin' (2014) reached peak positions on both the country albums and Independent Albums charts.

Albums

Studio albums

Compilation albums

Extended plays

Singles

As lead artist

As a featured artist

Music videos

As lead artist

As guest artist

Other appearances

Notes

References

External links
 
 Lee Ann Womack discography at Discogs

Country music discographies
Discographies of American artists